Polwhele House School is a day and boarding prep school at Polwhele House, near Truro, Cornwall.

It follows the thirteen-plus Common Entrance Examination syllabus.

In 2020, the school announced plans to provide senior school education, slowly extending its leaving age to sixteen, with a Year 9 class to be launched in September 2021.

History
In 1976 one the school’s founders, Rosemary White, launched a nursery and pre-prep school in her family home in Truro, calling it Boscawen Rose School. This was a school for children aged between three and eight. By 1981, the high demand for places had encouraged Rosemary and her husband Richard White to open a new school at Polwhele House, transferring most of the Boscawen Rose School pupils there and including older children. They were joint heads of the new enterprise, which was to be a co-educational non-denominational Christian preparatory school. The leaving age increased to thirteen.

After Truro Cathedral School closed in July 1982, its task of educating and training the cathedral's boy choristers was  transferred to Polwhele House, and the number of choristers is now eighteen. The Chapter of the Cathedral pays half of their school fees, and voice trials take place once a year in January, for boys aged between seven and nine. Girl choristers attend Truro School.

The Whites retired as joint heads in 2002, but remain the owners of the school, and Richard White (born 1943) is chairman of the Managing Council.

School site

Polwhele House is a Grade II listed manor house, standing in 32 acres of parkland, playing fields, gardens, and woods, about two miles north of Truro.

The earliest parts of the main house date from the 16th century, and granite arches from that time are the oldest features still to be seen. Richard Polwhele, a clergyman and local historian, inherited the property from his father and in the 1820s renovated the coach house. In the 1860s, Thomas Carne Polwhele had the house remodelled and enlarged by Giles Gilbert Scott. The Polwhele family motto, "Karenza Whelas Karenza", meaning "Love begets Love", is engraved on a stone chimneypiece in the drawing room of the house and has been adopted as the school’s motto.

Curriculum
Polwhele House follows a syllabus leading to the Common Entrance Examination at 13-plus.

There is a focus on music and drama, with  concerts and productions taking place regularly throughout the year and most children taking part in them.

A new Year 9 class will begin in September 2020, with the school’s leaving age then slowly rising to sixteen. The head, Hilary Mann, said in January 2020 "The school will grow by one senior year group each year, slowly and steadily. Our current buildings give scope for the first year expansion, and in time we can plan a redesign of the buildings and look to add any necessary new buildings."

Extracurricular activities
The school has its own ponies, and most children learn to ride. There is a pony club at weekends and during the school holidays which is open to children who are not at the school.

In May 2012, the Olympic torch came to the school. In May 2017, it was visited by a Royal Navy Merlin maritime helicopter based at RNAS Culdrose, and children were able to explore and discuss it with its crew.

List of heads
1981–2002: Rosemary and Richard White (jointly)
2002–2009: Jeremy Mason, previously deputy head at the Pilgrims' School, Winchester
2009–2019: Alex McCullough, previously Director of Studies at Foremarke Hall
2019– Hilary Mann, previously head of Roselyon Preparatory School, Lanlivery

A deputy head of the school, Dominic Floyd, went on to become head of Ashdown House, and then of Hazlegrove and the Mount Kelly Prep School.

Notable former pupils
Charlie Shreck (born 1978), cricketer

References

External links
Head of Polwhele House: Information for applicants at cloudfront.net
Polwhele House School at Independent Schools Inspectorate
Polwhele House School at schoolsmith.co.uk 

1981 establishments in England
Cathedral schools
Choir schools in England
Preparatory schools in Cornwall
Educational institutions disestablished in 1981
Truro